The Cadbury Creme Egg Twisted was a chocolate bar produced by Cadbury UK in the United Kingdom.  It was a milk chocolate bar with a filling of Cadbury Creme Egg fondant.  Introduced in 2008, it was a result of Cadbury researching that customers wanted the Creme Egg to be available all year, mainly for the fondant centre rather than the egg shape.  Previously, the fondant Creme Egg center was available as a filling in the Cadbury Dairy Milk line, but that has since then been phased out with the Creme Egg Twisted replacing it. Currently, only the Cadbury Heroes mini variation is available in the UK.

During 2011, the bar was introduced to Australia, but was pulled from stores several months later due to low popularity.

Advertising
In May 2008, an advertisement screened on ITV and Channel 4 in the United Kingdom, featured in various ways a creme egg being melted while still in its wrapper (there were various versions of the commercial), only to mutate into a Twisted while yelling "Goo!" at random intervals and "spitting" out some of its goo, before repeating the word again when the advert finishes.

Types
Creme Egg Twisted

• Milk chocolate with a soft fondant Creme Egg centre

• Launched 2007, discontinued 2012, secretly relaunched 2013 and discontinued again.

• Currently discontinued

Creme Egg Twisted Minis

• A small chocolate parcel with a soft fondant Creme Egg filling

• Launched 2009

• Currently available, In Cadburys heroes or sharing pack

See also
Cadbury Creme Egg
Cadbury Dairy Milk
Cadbury
Easter

References

External links

Cadbury brands
Chocolate bars
Brand name chocolate
Products introduced in 2008
Mondelez International brands
Food and drink introduced in 2008